The 35th Operations Group (35 OG) is the operational flying component of the United States Air Force 35th Fighter Wing. It is stationed at Misawa Air Base, Japan, and is a part of Pacific Air Forces (PACAF).

During World War II, the unit's predecessor, the 35th Fighter Group operated primarily in the Southwest Pacific Theater as part of Fifth Air Force, first using P-38s and P-39s, and later P-47s. The group engaged the enemy in numerous campaigns being awarded both the United States Distinguished Unit Citation and the Philippine Presidential Unit Citation.

The group operated from bases in Japan and South Korea during the Korean War, in support of UN ground forces, bombing and strafing enemy supply lines, troop concentrations, and communications, earning a second DUC.

Since the 1990s, the group has deployed aircraft and personnel to Southwest Asia, in support of both the Iraqi no-fly zones (Operations Southern Watch and Northern Watch), and the Global War on Terrorism.

Overview
The 35 OG is a combat-ready fighter group composed of two deployable F-16CJ "Wild Weasel" fighter squadrons (Tail Code: WW), one operational support squadron, and one air control flight capable of conducting and supporting air operations worldwide. Responsible for flight operations, airfield management, intelligence, tactical air control, combat plans, weapons and tactics, and weather support for the 35 FW. The group is assigned the following squadrons:

 13th Fighter Squadron (Red tail stripe) "Panthers"
 14th Fighter Squadron (Yellow tail stripe) "Fightin' Samurai"
 35th Operations Support Squadron
 610th Air Control Flight

History
 For additional history and lineage, see 35th Fighter Wing

The 35th Pursuit Group (Interceptor) was activated at Moffett Field, California on 1 February 1940. Initial squadrons of the group were the 21st Pursuit Squadron and 34th Pursuit Squadrons. Initially training with Seversky P-35s, P-36 Hawks, P-39 Airacobras, and Curtiss P-40 aircraft, the group moved to the Philippines in November 1941.

World War II
The air echelons of the 21st and 34th Pursuit squadrons arrived in Philippines and were attached to the 24th Pursuit Group, being stationed at Nichols and Del Carmen Fields on Luzon.

Headquarters and a third squadron (70th) sailed for Manila on 5 December but because of the Japanese attack on Pearl Harbor they returned to Hamilton Field where the squadron flew some patrols.

The 21st and 34th Pursuit Squadrons fought in the Battle of the Philippines (1941–42). Both squadrons were wiped out in the battle, with the men eventually fighting as infantry during the Battle of Bataan. The survivors were subjected to the Bataan Death March, although some did escape to Australia.

Headquarters and the 70th squadron sailed for Brisbane, Australia on 12 January 1942. On 15 January all the combat squadrons were relieved and three others, still in the US, were assigned.

Headquarters reached Brisbane Australia in February 1942 while the squadrons had moved from the US to various locations (Ballarat, Mount Gambier, Williamstown, Woodstock) in Australia and were training for combat with P-39s.

From Australia, the 35th entered combat with Fifth Air Force, operating successively from bases in Australia, New Guinea, Owi, Morotai, and the Philippines. First used P-38s and P-39s; equipped with Republic P-47 Thunderbolts late in 1943 and with North American P-51 Mustangs in March 1945. The group helped to halt the Japanese advance in Papua and took part in the Allied offensive that recovered the rest of New Guinea, flying protective patrols over Port Moresby, escorting bombers and transports, attacking Japanese airfields and supply lines, and providing cover for Allied landings.

In 1944 the 35th began long-range missions against enemy airfields and installations in the southern Philippines, Halmahera, and Borneo, preparatory to the US invasion of the Philippines. Beginning in January 1945, operated in support of ground forces on Luzon. Also escorted bombers and completed some fighter sweeps to Formosa and China. Bombed and strafed railways and airfields in Kyūshū and Korea after moving to Okinawa in June 1945.

After the surrender of Japan, the group became part of Far East Air Forces occupation forces and trained, took part in maneuvers, and flew surveillance patrols over Honshū.

Korean War

The 35th entered combat in the Korean War in July 1950, flying F-80s and later F-51s. It operated from bases in Japan and both North and South Korea in support of UN ground forces, bombing and strafing enemy supply lines, troop concentrations, and communications. In August 1950 No. 77 Squadron RAAF was assigned to the 35th Fighter Group for operations during the Korean War. Transferring back to Japan in May 1951, it became non-operational in January–July 1954. It then provided air defense for central Japan until late 1956 but was not operational from October 1956 – October 1957.

Between July 1963 and July 1965, the 35th Tactical Group assisted in training the Royal Thai Air Force and supported and exercised operational control over USAF units and detachments in Thailand assigned or attached to the 2d Air Division.

In an administrative ("paper") realignment in Washington DC in January 1984, the inactive 35th Tactical Group and the inactive 35th Fighter-Interceptor Group were consolidated into one unit. Both remained inactive.

Between May 1993 and October 1994, the resurrected 35th Operations Group managed a fighter (F-15C) and rescue squadron (HH-60G) in Iceland under the 35th Wing. The group activated at Misawa AB, Japan on 1 October 1994, as part of the 35th Fighter Wing, replacing the 432d Fighter Wing and assuming its personnel and F-16C/D aircraft, the same day it inactivated in Iceland. It supported units of the Japanese Air Self Defense Force (JASDF) Northern Air Defense Force. In addition to providing air defense of northern Japan, the group deployed aircraft and personnel to Southwest Asia in support of Operations NORTHERN and Southern Watch and the War on Terrorism 1997–2003.

Lineage
 Established as 35 Pursuit Group (Interceptor) on 22 December 1939
 Activated on 1 February 1940
 Redesignated: 35 Fighter Group on 15 May 1942
 Redesignated: 35 Fighter-Interceptor Group on 20 January 1950
 Inactivated on 1 October 1957
 Consolidated (31 January 1984) with the 35 Tactical Group, which was constituted, and activated, on 19 June 1963.
 Organized on 8 July 1963
 Discontinued, and inactivated, on 8 July 1965
 Redesignated 35 Operations Group on 9 April 1993
 Activated on 31 May 1993
 Inactivated on 1 October 1994
 Activated on 1 October 1994.

Assignments

 General Headquarters Air Force, 1 February 1940
 Southwest Air District (later, 4th Air Force), 16 January 1941
 IV Interceptor Command, 2 October 1941
 10th Fighter Wing, 9 December 1941 – 12 January 1942
 Allied Air Forces, Southwest Pacific Area, 23 April 1942
 5th (later, Fifth) Air Force, 6 September 1942
 V Fighter Command, 11 November 1942
 Attached to: 310th Bombardment Wing, 1 February 1944–
 85th Fighter Wing, 19 April 1944
 Remained attached to: 310 Bombardment Wing until 1 August 1944
 Attached to: 309 Bombardment Wing, 1 August–September 1944
 Attached to: 310 Bombardment Wing, 2 October 1944–
 V Fighter Command, 11 May 1945
 Remained attached to: 310 Bombardment Wing entire time

 V Bomber Command, 10 November 1945
 Remained attached to: 310 Bombardment Wing until 25 March 1946
 314th Composite Wing, 25 May 1946
 35th Fighter (later, 35 Fighter-Interceptor) Wing, 18 August 1948 – 1 October 1957
 Attached to: 6131 Tactical Support Wing, 1 August-5 September 1950
 Attached to: 350 Tactical Support Wing, 6 September-1 December 1950
 Attached to: 318 Fighter-Bomber Wing, 7–24 May 1951
 Pacific Air Forces, 19 June 1963
 2d Air Division, 8 July 1963 – 8 July 1965
 35th Wing, 31 May 1993 – 1 October 1994
 35th Fighter Wing, 1 October 1994–present

Components
 13th Fighter Squadron: 1 October 1994–present
 14th Fighter Squadron: 1 October 1994–present
 18th Pursuit Squadron: 1 February 1940 – February 1941
 20th Pursuit Squadron: 1 February-14 December 1940 (detached 30 October-14 December 1940)
 21 Pursuit Squadron: 1 February 1940 – 15 January 1942 (detached 1 October 1941 – 15 January 1942)
 34 Pursuit Squadron: 30 November 1940 – 15 January 1942 (detached 1 October 1941 – 15 January 1942)
 39 Fighter (later, 39 Fighter-Interceptor) Squadron: 15 January 1942 – 1 October 1957 (detached March-4 May 1942; 7 May 1951 – 14 July 1954; 8 October 1956 – 1 July 1957)
 40 Pursuit (later, 40 Fighter; 40 Fighter-Interceptor) Squadron: 15 January 1942 – 1 October 1957 (detached March-4 May 1942; 15 January – 14 July 1954; 8 October 1956 – 1 July 1957)
 41 Pursuit (later, 41 Fighter; 41 Fighter-Interceptor) Squadron: 15 January 1942 – 1 October 1957 (detached March-4 May 1942; 9 July 1950 – 25 June 1951; 15 January – 14 July 1954)
 56 Rescue: 31 May 1993 – 1 October 1994
 57th Fighter Squadron: 31 May 1993 – 1 October 1994
 70 Pursuit Squadron: 1 January 1941 – 15 January 1942
 82 Tactical Reconnaissance: attached 20 October 1945 – 9 February 1946.

Stations

 Moffett Field, California, 1 February 1940
 Hamilton Field, California, 10 September 1940 – 5 December 1941 and 9 December 1941 – 12 January 1942
 Archerfield Airport, Brisbane, Australia, 1 February 1942
 New Delhi Airport, India, March 1942
 Sydney Airport, Australia, 4 May 1942
 Port Moresby Airfield Complex, New Guinea, 22 July 1942
 Tsili Tsili Airfield, New Guinea, 15 August 1943
 Nadzab Airfield Complex, New Guinea, 5 October 1943
 Gusap Airfield, New Guinea, 7 February 1944
 Owi Airfield, Schouten Islands, 22 July 1944
 Wama Airfield, Morotai, Netherlands East Indies, 27 September 1944
 Mangaldan Airfield, Luzon, Philippines, c. 20 January 1945
 Lingayen Airfield, Luzon, Philippines, c. 10 April 1945
 Clark Field, Luzon, Philippines, 19 April 1945

 Ie Shima Airfield, Okinawa, 28 June 1945
 Irumagawa (later, Johnson AFB; Johnson AB), Japan, October 1945
 Yokota AB, Japan, 1 April 1950
 Ashiya AB, Japan, 8 July 1950
 Pohang AB (K-3), South Korea, 14 July 1950
 Tsuiki AB, Japan, 13 August 1950
 Pohang AB (K-3), South Korea, 3 October 1950
 Yonpo AB (K-27), North Korea, 18 November 1950
 Pusan AB (K-1), South Korea, c. 3 December 1950
 Johnson AB, Japan, 25 May 1951
 Yokota AB, Japan, 14 August 1954 – 1 October 1957
 Don Muang Royal Thai Air Force Base, Thailand, 8 July 1963 – 8 July 1965
 Naval Air Station Keflavik, Iceland, 31 May 1993 – 1 October 1994
 Misawa AB, Japan, 1 October 1994–present

Aircraft

 P-35, 1940–1941
 P-36, 1940–1941
 P-40, 1940–1941
 P-39, 1942–1944
 P-400, 1942
 P-38, 1942–1943
 P-47, 1943–1945
 F-51, 1945–1950, 1950–1951, 1951–1953
 F-61, 1949–1950
 F-80, 1949–1950, 1951–1954

 F-82, 1949–1950
 F-94, 1951–1954
 F-86, 1951, 1952–1953, 1953–1957
 RF-80, 1950, 1951–1952, 1953–1954
 RF-51, 1952–1953
 RC-45, 1952–1954
 C-47, 1963, 1964–1965
 F-15, 1993–1994
 HH-60, 1993–1994
 F-16, 1994–present

See also
 United States Army Air Forces in Australia

References

External links
 35th Fighter Wing History

035